Rubies, previously known as Braves, were an English women's cricket team that competed in the Super Fours. The squad varied from season to season, but was made up of some of the top players in English cricket. They were captained by Clare Connor for their first four seasons, and were subsequently captained by various England players such as Lydia Greenway. They won four Super Fours titles in their history: two 50-over tournaments and two Twenty20 tournaments.

History

2002–2005: Braves
The Super Fours was established in 2002 as a way of bridging the gap between women's county cricket and international cricket, bringing together the top players in England. Braves was one of the teams established, and was captained by Clare Connor. They won the first 50 over tournament that took place, winning 4 out of 6 games. 

Braves failed to replicate this form over the next few seasons, however, finishing 3rd, 2nd and 4th in 2003, 2004, 2005, respectively. The did reach the inaugural Twenty20 final in 2004, but lost to V Team by 8 wickets.

2006–2013: Rubies
In 2006 the side was renamed Rubies and a season later, in 2007, they achieved their second title, winning all six of their games to win the 50 over tournament. Rubies batter Lydia Greenway was the tournament leading run-scorer, and bowler Holly Colvin was the leading wicket-taker, including taking 5/7 against Sapphires. Whilst they did not win the 50 over title again, they did add two Twenty20 titles to their honours list, winning in 2008 and 2012.

Seasons

Super Fours

Super Fours Twenty20

References

2002 establishments in England
Super Fours teams